Neuroscience Group Field at Fox Cities Stadium is a baseball park in Grand Chute, Wisconsin (although it has an Appleton mailing address). It is primarily used for baseball, and is the home field of the Wisconsin Timber Rattlers, the Midwest League Minor League Baseball affiliate of the Milwaukee Brewers. The stadium also hosts a few music concerts each year. From 2000 until 2018, it hosted the NCAA Division III College World Series; the contract to host the event ran out in 2018 and the stadium chose to not renew the contract due to the expanded D-III playoffs schedule conflicting with the Timber Rattlers' schedule. The stadium was built in 1995, and holds 5,900 people. It is also the site of the Wisconsin Interscholastic Athletic Association High School Spring Baseball Championship.

History

On March 9, 2007, Time Warner Cable, the area's cable provider before its 2017 merger with Charter Communications (and then-broadcast partner of the team through its local cable sports channel), signed a 10-year naming rights deal. In December 2013 Time Warner opted out of the final three years of the deal.  In January 2014, Neuroscience Group, a local neurology practice, reached a 10-year deal for naming rights.

Following the cancelled 2020 minor league season, Appleton Baseball Club, Inc, sold the Timber Rattlers to Third Base Ventures, LLC, a group consisting of principal owner Craig Dickman and minority owners team president Rob Zerjav and Brad Raaths. The group also purchased the team's ballpark from the Fox Cities Amateur Sports Authority with plans to keep the team in Grand Chute.

Renovations
In November 2012, the stadium began a major renovation that was completed in 2013. This allowed for functions such as weddings or large meetings on a year-round basis. Further renovations were announced in September 2022 with completion projected before the 2023 season. The renovations will meet the new standards for minor league stadiums announced in 2021.

References
Specific

General

External links
Wisconsin Timber Rattlers: Fox Cities Stadium

1995 establishments in Wisconsin
Baseball venues in Wisconsin
Buildings and structures in Outagamie County, Wisconsin
College baseball venues in the United States
Minor league baseball venues
Sports venues completed in 1995
Tourist attractions in Outagamie County, Wisconsin
Midwest League ballparks